Statistics of the V-League in the 1985 season.

First stage
Though not mentioned in any records, the draw limit was used similar to some Soviet Top League seasons. From the 4th draw on, points would not be counted.

Group A

Group B

Group C

Second stage

Group 1

Group 2

Semifinals
Two teams from Group B were disqualified, so there was no semifinals

Final
CN Ha Nam Ninh    3-1	So CN TP.HCM

Relegation

References

Vietnamese Super League seasons
1
Viet
Viet